Michail Elgin and Alexandre Kudryavtsev won the final against Tomasz Bednarek and Michał Przysiężny 3–6, 6–3, [10–3].

Seeds

Draw

Draw

External links
 Main Draw

Internazionali Tennis Val Gardena Sudtirol - Doubles
Internazionali Tennis Val Gardena Südtirol